A gigolo is a male escort or companion who is supported by a woman in a continuing relationship, or to a number of women serially, over a period of time.

Gigolo or gigolos may also refer to:

 A male prostitute who is paid for sexual services to either women or men

Music
 The Gigolo (album), a 1965 hard bop jazz album by trumpeter Lee Morgan
 "Gigolo" (Elena Paparizou song), 2006
 "Gigolo" (Mary Wells song), 1981
 "Gigolo" (Nick Cannon song), 2003
 "Gigolo" (The Damned song), 1987
 "Gigolo", a song by Miss Kittin & The Hacker from Champagne
 "Gigolo", a song by Thomas Anders and Uwe Fahrenkrog-Petersen, 2011

Films
 Gigolo (film), a 1927 silent film starring Rod La Rocque
 The Gigolo (1960 film)
 The Gigolos, a 2006 film
 The Gigolo (2015 film), Hong Kong film
 The Gigolo 2

Other
 Gigolo FRH (1983–2009), a dressage horse
 Gigolos, a 2011 Showtime television series

See also
 Just a Gigolo (disambiguation)